Red Ryan may refer to:
Norman J. Ryan, Canadian gangster
Red Ryan (baseball), American baseball player